Lipovec may refer to:

 Lipovec (Blansko District), a village in the South Moravian Region of the Czech Republic
 Lipovec (Chrudim District), a village in the Pardubice Region of the Czech Republic
 Lipovec, Krapina-Zagorje County, a village in northern Croatia
 Lipovec, Martin, a village in the Žilina Region of Slovakia
 Lipovec, Ribnica, a village in Slovenia
 Lipovec, Rimavská Sobota, a village in the Banská Bystrica Region of Slovakia
 Lipovec, Semič, Slovenia
 Lipovec, Šmarje pri Jelšah, Slovenia
 Lipovec pri Kostelu, a village in Slovenia
 Lipovec pri Škofji Vasi, a village in Slovenia

See also
 Lypovets, a village in Ukraine
 Lipovac (disambiguation)
 Lipowiec (disambiguation)